Smash hit may refer to:
 An overwhelming success, especially in the entertainment industry, such as an extraordinarily successful hit single (hit in the sense of "hitting the sales charts")
 Hit o Nerae!, an anime series
 Smash Hit, a video game developed by Mediocre AB

See also 
 Smash Hits (disambiguation)